Taishan District may refer to:

Taishan District, Tai'an, in Shandong, PR China
Taishan District, New Taipei, in Taiwan

District name disambiguation pages